Luce Dufault (born August 19, 1966 in Orleans, Ontario) is a Canadian singer. She is of French descent. She performed in two musicals from Luc Plamondon, La Légende de Jimmy and Starmania. She recorded a few hits including Soirs de scotch, Au delà des mots and Ce qu'il reste de nous.

In March 2019, she was one of 11 singers from Quebec, alongside Ginette Reno, Diane Dufresne, Céline Dion, Isabelle Boulay, Louise Forestier, Laurence Jalbert, Catherine Major, Ariane Moffatt, Marie Denise Pelletier and Marie-Élaine Thibert, who participated in a supergroup recording of Renée Claude's 1971 single "Tu trouveras la paix" after Claude's diagnosis with Alzheimer's disease was announced.

Discography 
1996 – Luce Dufault
1998 – Des milliards de choses
2000 – Soir de première
2001 – Au-delà des mots
2004 – Bleu
2007 – Demi-jour
2010 – Luce
2013 – Du temps pour moi
2020 – Dire combien je t'aime No. 44 Canadian Albums Chart

Family
Dufault is related to artist and writer Ernest Dufault, better known by the alias Will James. She is also related to journalist and sports commentator Pierre Dufault.

References

External links 
Official Website 

1966 births
French-language singers of Canada
Musicians from Ottawa
Living people
Canadian women pop singers
20th-century Canadian women singers
21st-century Canadian women singers